Caleb Stanko (born July 26, 1993) is an American professional soccer player who plays as a midfielder for Super League Greece club Lamia.

Early life
Stanko started playing soccer with the local U.S. Soccer Development Academy club Vardar SC. Won U.S. Soccer Development Academy National Championship in 2010.

Club career

SC Freiburg
In 2011, Stanko moved to the German side SC Freiburg, and began playing for its second team. From 2013, he started training with the first team and was benched for several matches before debuting in August 2015 in a German Cup match against Barmbek-Uhlenhorst. In November 2015, he made his league debut for Freiburg in a 2. Bundesliga match against Paderborn 07. Stanko had five 2. Bundesliga appearances for the season, helping Freiburg to Bundesliga promotion.

Loan to FC Vaduz
Stanko was loaned by Freiburg to Liechtenstein-based FC Vaduz in the Swiss Super League for the 2016–2017 season, making 26 appearances.

FC Cincinnati
On January 23, 2019, Stanko moved back to the United States to sign with Major League Soccer side FC Cincinnati. Following the 2021 season, Cincinnati declined their contract option on Stanko.

PAS Giannina
On January 5, 2022, Stanko signed a contract with Super League Greece club PAS Giannina.

International career
Stanko played at the 2013 CONCACAF U-20 Championship for the United States, who finished as runners-up. Later that year, he also played at the 2013 Toulon Tournament for the U.S., and then captained the U.S. during their opening match against Spain at the 2013 FIFA U-20 World Cup.

Stanko received his first call-up to the United States men's national team for a May 22, 2016 friendly against Puerto Rico. On September 6, 2016, he made his full USMNT debut in a World Cup qualifying match against Trinidad & Tobago.

Honors
FC Vaduz
Liechtenstein Football Cup: 2016–17

Career statistics

Club

References

External links

 

1993 births
Living people
People from Holly, Michigan
Association football midfielders
American soccer players
Soccer players from Michigan
SC Freiburg II players
SC Freiburg players
FC Vaduz players
Regionalliga players
2. Bundesliga players
Swiss Super League players
Bundesliga players
Major League Soccer players
Super League Greece players
FC Cincinnati players
PAS Giannina F.C. players
Asteras Tripolis F.C. players
American expatriate soccer players
American expatriate soccer players in Germany
American expatriate sportspeople in Greece
Expatriate footballers in Liechtenstein
Expatriate footballers in Greece
United States men's under-20 international soccer players
United States men's international soccer players